Adrian John Charles Hope, 4th Marquess of Linlithgow (born 1 July 1946), styled Viscount Aithrie until 1952 and Earl of Hopetoun between 1952 and 1987, is a British noble. His family seat is Hopetoun House, near Edinburgh, Scotland. He was educated at Eton College.

Family
Lord Linlithgow is the son of Charles Hope, 3rd Marquess of Linlithgow, and Vivien Kenyon-Slaney (1918–1964).

Lord Linlithgow has been married three times. He married, firstly, Anne Pamela Leveson, daughter of Arthur Edmund Leveson and Margaret Ruth Maude, on 9 January 1968. The couple had two children before divorcing in 1978.
 Andrew Victor Arthur Charles Hope, Earl of Hopetoun (b. 22 May 1969); married Skye Laurette Bovill, daughter of Major Bristow Charles Bovill and Kerry Anne Reynolds, on 10 July 1993. The couple have four children.
 Lord Alexander John Adrian Hope (b. 3 February 1971)

He married, secondly, Peta Carol Binding, daughter of Charles Victor Ormond Binding, in 1980. They had two children. He and Peta Carol Binding were divorced in 1997.
 Lady Louisa Vivienne Hope (b. 16 April 1981); married Michael Van den Berg in 2012
 Lord Robert Charles Robin Adrian Hope (b. 17 January 1984); married Tamarisk Zoe Morris in 2015

He married, thirdly, Auriol Veronica Mackeson-Sandbach, daughter of Captain Graham Lawrie Mackeson-Sandbach and Geraldine Pamela Violet Sandbach, on 1 November 1997. He and Auriol Veronica Mackeson-Sandbach were divorced in 2007.

The current Marquess is expected to be succeeded by his eldest son, Andrew, Earl of Hopetoun. Lord Hopetoun is married to Skye Bovill, now Countess of Hopetoun. He is a former Page of Honour to Queen Elizabeth the Queen Mother. Lord and Lady Hopetoun take part in the Queen's carriage procession at Royal Ascot.

Lord and Lady Hopetoun live in Hopetoun House and the 4th Marquess lives on the Estate.

References

External links

  

1946 births
Living people
People educated at Eton College
Adrian
Marquesses of Linlithgow
Linlithgow